Banavan (also Romanized as Banavān and Banvān; also known as  Khir, and Qal‘eh-i-Banaven) is a village in Khir Rural District, Roniz District, Estahban County, Fars Province, Iran. At the 2006 census, its population was 1,695, in 427 families.

References 

Populated places in Estahban County